David Ragland (born April 28, 1981) is an American basketball coach who is the current head coach of the Evansville Aces men's basketball team.

Playing career
Ragland attended his first two years of college at Missouri Southern State, competing on the men's basketball team before transferring home to play for Southern Indiana.

Coaching career
Ragland began his coaching career in the junior college ranks, starting at Frank Phillips College in Borger, Texas as an assistant coach for one season before moving on to Vincennes, where he'd serve as an assistant for three seasons before being elevated to head coach for two seasons, going 44–19. In 2010, Ragland would move to the Division I ranks, joining Greg Lansing's staff at Indiana State. He'd then join Bowling Green and Northern Kentucky as an assistant coach for back-to-back seasons, before landing on the coaching staff at Valparaiso. He'd then head west as an assistant coach under Craig Smith at Utah State where he was on staff for three consecutive NCAA tournament appearances, two Mountain West Conference tournament titles and Mountain West regular season title. Ragland would return to the state of Indiana, joining LaVall Jordan's staff at Butler for a single season.   

On May 24, 2022, Ragland was announced as the new head men's basketball coach at Evansville, replacing Todd Lickliter.

Head coaching record

NCAA D1

NJCAA

References

Living people
1981 births
American men's basketball coaches
Evansville Purple Aces men's basketball coaches
Butler Bulldogs men's basketball coaches
Utah State Aggies men's basketball coaches
Bowling Green Falcons men's basketball coaches
Northern Kentucky Norse men's basketball coaches
Valparaiso Beacons men's basketball coaches
Indiana State Sycamores men's basketball coaches
Vincennes Trailblazers men's basketball coaches
Southern Indiana Screaming Eagles men's basketball players
Sportspeople from Evansville, Indiana
Basketball coaches from Indiana